Enciclopedia Română was the first encyclopedia in the Romanian language. It was published in three volumes by the ASTRA.

The decision to published the Enciclopedia română was made at a meeting of the ASTRA on February 7, 1895. The Secretary of the organization Dr. Corneliu Diaconovich became editor in chief. The writers of this monumental work included may important figures;  scholars, historians, journalists, literati and painters such as Grigore Antipa, Victor Babeș, Leo Bachelin, Valeriu Braniște, Partenie Cosma, George Dima, Ovid Densusianu, Ionescu-Caion, George Lahovary, Titu Maiorescu, Ludovic Mrazec, Constantin Rădulescu-Motru, Dimitrie Onciul, Theodor Speranția, Alexandru A. Suțu, Nicolae Teclu, Alexandru D. Xenopol etc.

The three volumes of the work were published by W. Kraft of Sibiu:

 Volume I, had 936 pages, contained 10,401 articles (from A to Copenhagen) 9 maps, 111 illustrations and appendices, appeared in 1898.
 Volume II, had 947 pages, contained 8,402 articles (Copepode to Keman) one map, 2 annexes and 20 illustrations, appeared in 1900. e-book
 Volume III, had 1276 pages, contained 18,819 articles (Kemet to Zymotic) 2 maps, 2 annexes and 16 illustrations, appeared in 1904. e-book

External links
  Istoria enciclopediei române editată de „Astra" în 1904, 10 August 2012, Virgil Lazar, România liberă
Enciclopedia română; publicată din insărcinarea și sub auspiciile Asociațiunii pentru literatura română și cultura poporului român de Dr. C. Diaconoich.  second and third volumes at HathiTrust

Romanian encyclopedias
1898 non-fiction books
19th-century encyclopedias
20th-century encyclopedias